The Lebanese Super Cup is Lebanese football's annual match contested between the champions of the previous Lebanese Premier League season and the holders of the Lebanese FA Cup. If the Lebanese Premier League champions also won the Lebanese FA Cup then the league runners-up provide the opposition.

The fixture is recognized as a competitive super cup by the Lebanese Football Association and the Asian Football Confederation. Ahed is the most successful club in the competition with eight wins.

Winners and finalists

Winners by year

Results by team

Media coverage 
In October 2022, the LFA and FIFA signed an agreement to broadcast all matches in the Lebanese Super Cup, Lebanese Second Division and Lebanese Women's Football League through the FIFA+ platform, and some Lebanese Premier League games.

See also
Lebanese FA Cup
Lebanese Elite Cup
Lebanese Challenge Cup

References

External links
Lebanese Super Cup at Soccerway

 
Super Cup
National association football supercups
Recurring sporting events established in 1996
1990s establishments in Lebanon